Daniel "Dani" Alexis Leite Figueira (born 20 July 1998) is a Portuguese professional footballer who plays for G.D. Estoril Praia as a goalkeeper.

Club career

Vitória Guimarães
Born in Vizela, Braga District, Figueira finished his development at Guimarães-based Vitória S.C. after joining the club's academy at the age of 11. He made his LigaPro debut with the reserves on 17 March 2018, in a 1–1 away draw against F.C. Famalicão.

Estoril
Figueira signed a two-year contract with G.D. Estoril Praia also of the second division on 24 June 2019. He played 27 matches in the 2020–21 season, helping his team return to the Primeira Liga as champions and being voted the competition's best player in his position in the process.

On 8 August 2021, Figueira appeared in his first game in the Portuguese top flight, a 2–0 away win over F.C. Arouca.

Honours
Estoril
Liga Portugal 2: 2020–21

References

External links

1998 births
Living people
People from Vizela
Sportspeople from Braga District
Portuguese footballers
Association football goalkeepers
Primeira Liga players
Liga Portugal 2 players
Vitória S.C. B players
G.D. Estoril Praia players
Portugal youth international footballers